Sophia Chloe Drossopoulou is a computer scientist, currently working at Imperial College London, where she is Professor in Programming Languages. She earned her Ph.D. from the Karlsruhe Institute of Technology.

Her research interests are mainly in formal methods for programming languages; her work is notable for a proof of the soundness of the Java programming language.

Her first Ph.D. student was Diomidis Spinellis. She is the daughter of the author Athena Cacouris.
She currently teaches a first year course to Computing and Joint Mathematics and Computer Science undergraduates at Imperial College London called ‘Reasoning about Programs’.

Bibliography

References

External links 
 

Living people
Greek computer scientists
Greek women computer scientists
Academics of Imperial College London
Year of birth missing (living people)